This is a list of properties and districts in Polk County, Georgia that are listed on the National Register of Historic Places (NRHP).

Current listings

|}

References

Polk
Buildings and structures in Polk County, Georgia